Philippa K. Browning  is a Professor of Astrophysics in the Jodrell Bank Centre for Astrophysics at the University of Manchester. She specialises in the mathematical modelling of fusion plasmas.

Early life and education 
Browning was educated at Millfield and studied the Mathematical Tripos at the University of Cambridge, graduating in 1979. She completed Part III of the Mathematical Tripos in 1980. She was inspired by Yuri Gagarin to work in astrophysics. For her graduate studies Browning joined the University of St Andrews working with Eric Priest. She submitted her thesis on Inhomogeneous Magnetic Fields in the Solar Atmosphere in 1984.

Research and career 
After completing her PhD Browning worked as a postdoctoral researcher with Eric Priest. She studied coronal loops, finding they were a balance of magnetic tension forces, buoyancy and pressure gradients. Her work covered the fundamentals of flux tubes. Browning was appointed a lecturer at University of Manchester Institute of Science and Technology (UMIST) in 1985. She joined the University of Manchester in 2004, where she works on the interactions between plasmas and magnetic fields. She is particularly interested in solar flares. In 2009, Browning was promoted to professor at the Jodrell Bank Centre for Astrophysics. She served as editor of the Journal of Geophysical Research from 2010 to 2013. She contributed to the book Multi-scale Dynamical Processes in Space and Astrophysical Plasmas. She continues to study coronal heating.

In 2013 Browning was made chair of the Institute of Physics Plasma Physics Committee and the Solar Physics Council. Through the Solar Physics Council, Browning is a mentor for young solar physicists. In 2014 Browning arranged two-day meeting to discuss coronal heating at the Royal Society.

 Browning is working on the Solar Orbiter and Parker Solar Probe. Browning has appeared at the Bluedot Festival. She discussed her work on solar flares and their interaction with the earth. She has taken part in the Manchester Science Festival. Browning serves on the Institute of Physics Women in Physics advisory panel.

Awards and honours
Browning was awarded the Chapman Medal by the Royal Astronomical Society in 2016. The medal recognised her "pioneering work on energy release by magnetic relaxation in stressed coronal magnetic fields". In 2017 she was awarded a Science and Technology Facilities Council (STFC) research grant to explore particle acceleration in twisted magnetic fields. She was elected a Fellow of the Institute of Physics (FInstP).

References 

British astrophysicists
20th-century British astronomers
Women astrophysicists
Fellows of the Institute of Physics
British women physicists
People educated at Millfield
Alumni of the University of Cambridge
Academics of the University of Manchester Institute of Science and Technology
Academics of the University of Manchester
21st-century British astronomers